Eugene Gass Steinbrenner (November 17, 1892 – April 25, 1970) was a professional baseball second baseman, who played in Major League Baseball (MLB) for the Philadelphia Phillies in the  season. In 3 career games, he had two hits in 9 at-bats.

Steinbrenner was born in 1892 and died in Pittsburgh, Pennsylvania in 1970. Steinbrenner is buried at Union Dale Cemetery, Pittsburgh.

External links

1892 births
1970 deaths
Philadelphia Phillies players
Baseball players from Pennsylvania
Major League Baseball second basemen
Wheeling Stogies players
Norfolk Tars players
Richmond Climbers players
Hopewell Powder Puffs players